Basant may refer to:

 Basant (season), the spring season
 Basant (festival), a historic kite festival in the region of Punjab
 Basant (raga), an Indian classical raga
 Basant (film), a 2016 NEPALI film